Richard Bowker (born 1950) is a writer of crime and science fiction novels and short stories.

Works

Novels
Forbidden Sanctuary, Ballantine/Del Rey Books (1982) (science fiction)
Replica (1986) (science fiction)
Marlborough Street (1987)
Dover Beach (1987) (science fiction)
Summit (1989)
Senator (1994)

Short stories
"The Other Train Phenomenon" (1982)

Awards and nominations
Philip K. Dick Award - Best Novel nominee (1987): for Dover Beach

References

External links

20th-century American novelists
20th-century American male writers
American crime fiction writers
American male novelists
American science fiction writers
1950 births
Living people